Lohani may refer to:

People
Lohani, a Pashtun tribe 
Lohani (surname), Nepalese surname
Lohani, clan of the Mahuri, an Indian community traditionally engaged in the occupations as merchants, dairy farmers, and cultivators

Animal
Lohani (cattle), a breed of cattle from Pakistan

See also
Lohana, an Indian caste